Hartvig Philip Rée (12 October 1778 – 1 October 1859) was a Jewish-Danish merchant and author who built a large shipping and trade business to become one of the wealthiest people of his time. He created the first Jewish cemetery and synagogue in Aarhus at a time when Jews were frequently discriminated against and the Jewish population was negligible. He published a number of written works, mostly related to Jewish theology but also dealing with broader subjects such as economics.

Warly life and education
Rée was born in Fredericia to the German merchant Philip Hartvig Rée (1744–99) and his wife Hanna Hartvig (1759–1830) who had immigrated from Hamburg. His parents were spiritually inclined and especially had a desire to study Jewish traditions and history. His father hired tutors and teachers from abroad to teach his children. In combination Rée was given a thorough education in trade which was completed with several-years long stay in Hamburg with his uncle.

Career

Rée had to take over his father's business sooner than expected when his father died in 1799. Hartvig Philip Rée quickly moved his father's business to Aarhus and opened a branch in Randers. He got involved in shipping and started importing coal, iron, salt and hops and exporting grain, wool, fur and hides. He established a sugar refinery, a print shop, a dye business and a clothes factory in Randers. Rée became the wealthiest person in Aarhus, according to tax records, and he owned  Den Rosenørnske Gård in Vestergade, a large mansion by the Aarhus River where he created a large romanticist garden that became famous at his time.

Other activities
In the 1820s,  Rée established a synagogue in the first hall of the newly built side building in his estate in Vestergade. He published a number of works, mainly concerned with religious philosophy and theology. He was a proponent of a liberal interpretation of Jewish theology and reforms of Jewish traditions which he defended in a number of publications in German and Danish. He also published an interpretation of John's Revelation, wrote of national economy and occasionally some poetry.

Personal life
 
He married his cousin Thamar (Therese) Rée on 12 March 1804 and they had a number of children including Hertz Hartvig Rée, Anton Rée, Bernhard Philip Rée, Simon Philip Rée, Israel Philip Rée, Vilhelm Hartvig Rée and  Frederikke Privche von Essen.

When his wife Thamar Rée died in 1850, he lost interest in his business and moved to Copenhagen where he spent the rest of his life in a modest apartment, continuing his studies. His son, Hertz Rée  took over the business. He died in 1859 at Copenhagen.

Literatur
Hartvig Philip Rée und sein Geschlecht. Auf Veranlassung des Herrn Fondsmaklers Direktor Eduard Rée. Herausgegeben von Josef Fischer, 1871-1949. 
Copenhagen, 1912

References

Extermal links
 Hartvig Philip Rée  og hans Slæget

1778 births
1859 deaths
19th-century Danish businesspeople
Danish businesspeople in shipping
People from Fredericia
Danish male writers
19th-century Danish non-fiction writers
Danish Jews
Danish people of German-Jewish descent
Male non-fiction writers